This is a list of past and present Cardiff Rugby players who have been capped by their country whilst at the club. Ten nations have played international matches with teams featuring Cardiff City players. 


Wales
 Aled Brew
 Gareth Cooper
 Chris Czekaj
 Bradley Davies
 Leigh Halfpenny
 Iestyn Harris
 Tom James
 Gethin Jenkins
 Deiniol Jones
 Scott Morgan
 Mike Phillips
 Andy Powell
 Richie Rees
 Jamie Roberts
 Jamie Robinson
 Nicky Robinson
 Tom Shanklin
 Robert Sidoli
 Robin Sowden-Taylor
 Gareth Thomas
 T. Rhys Thomas
 Sam Warburton
 Gareth Williams
 Martyn Williams
 Rhys Williams
 John Yapp

Australia
 Sam Norton-Knight
 Marc Stcherbina

Canada
 Dan Baugh
 Ed Fairhurst

Fiji
 Mosese Luveitasau

New Zealand
 Ben Blair

Scotland
 Dan Parks

Tonga
 Maama Molitika

United States
 Kort Schubert

References

Cardiff Rugby players